The 2009–10 WNBL season was the 30th season of competition since its establishment in 1981. A total of 10 teams contested the league. The regular season was played between October 2009 and March 2010, followed by a post-season involving the top five in March 2010. The Canberra Capitals were the defending champions and they successfully defended their title with a 75–70 win over the Bulleen Boomers in the Grand Final.

Broadcast rights were held by free-to-air network ABC. ABC broadcast one game a week, at 1:00PM at every standard time in Australia. Molten provided equipment including the official game ball, with Hoop2Hoop supplying team apparel.

Team standings

Finals

Season award winners

Statistics leaders

References

2007-08
2009–10 in Australian basketball
Aus
basketball
basketball